Kevin Seibel (born March 8, 1983) is a Canadian former professional ice hockey defenceman. Seibel most recently played with the Wichita Thunder of the Central Hockey League.

References

External links

1983 births
Living people
Bossier-Shreveport Mudbugs players
Canadian ice hockey defencemen
Ice hockey people from Saskatchewan
Lincoln Stars players
Odessa Jackalopes players
People from Swift Current
Prince George Cougars players
Rødovre Mighty Bulls players
Swift Current Broncos players
Fort Worth Brahmas players
Tulsa Oilers (1992–present) players
Vancouver Giants players
Wichita Thunder players
Canadian expatriate ice hockey players in Denmark
Canadian expatriate ice hockey players in the United States
UBC Thunderbirds ice hockey players